Yumachrysa is a genus of green lacewings in the family Chrysopidae. There are at least four described species in Yumachrysa.

Species
These four species belong to the genus Yumachrysa:
 Yumachrysa apache (Banks, 1938)
 Yumachrysa clarivena (Banks, 1950)
 Yumachrysa incerta (Banks, 1895)
 Yumachrysa yuma (Banks, 1950)

References

Further reading

 
 
 

Chrysopidae
Articles created by Qbugbot